We Will Not Be Shaken (Live) is the tenth album from California based Bethel Music. The album was released through the group's label, Bethel Music, on January 26, 2015. The album was produced by Bobby Strand, Chris Greely, and Matthew Wilcox, and executively produced by Brian Johnson and Joel Taylor.

Singles
"No Longer Slaves" featuring Jonathan David and Melissa Helser was released as the lead single from the album on August 21, 2015. The song was studio recorded prior to being released to Christian radio.

Critical reception
Kevin Davis of New Release Today said, "On a mountaintop north of Redding, CA, the Bethel Music community gathered for an unforgettable evening of worship. The resulting live album and film portrays breathtaking visuals and resounds with hope. We Will Not Be Shaken presents 11 new songs led by Bethel Music's artist collective, including several debut artists. The accompanying film chronicles the full evening of worship interwoven with honest stories as told by Bethel Music leaders about pursuing authentic community amidst an ever-growing and changing culture. Birthed in a spontaneous moment of worship, the album's title track "We Will not Be Shaken" hails a message of promise amidst adversity and the victory we have in Jesus. The live film powerfully captures the energy and declarations that echoed into the night and invites listeners to join in praise." Christopher Smith of Jesus Freak Hideout said, "Recorded live at Shasta Lake in California, We Will Not Be Shaken is an evening of worship led by the artist collective, Bethel Music. Though artists like Jeremy Riddle and Steffany Gretzinger are missing from this project, the artists that are featured here provide an intimate worshipful environment for these eleven brand new songs. For having nine lead singers, We Will Not Be Shaken is surprisingly cohesive. There are also a handful of artists that make their debut on here on the album, including Kalley Heiligenthal, Hannah McClure, Paul McClure, Jonathan Helser and Melissa Helser. All of these vocalists are relatively talented and help foster the true heart of worship: Jesus. There are even a few points where their passion for Jesus really bursts through, such as at the end of "No Longer Slaves" where newcomer Jonathan Helser cracks his voice out of complete abandonment while singing. Though the artists of Bethel Music focus more on the personal qualities of God, they effectively communicate both these awe-inspiring and fatherly characteristics of God. However, there are several areas throughout the album that seem to lack vulnerability and urgency in our need for Jesus. Even still, most of the songs do have strong lyrical moments, and a few even manage to avoid any problems completely, such as the beautifully penned "Nearness" and "In Over My Head." The music on We Will Not Be Shaken boasts a gentle tone which could be described as a cross between Hillsong and All Sons and Daughters - though not as unique as the latter. Despite the plethora of singers and instrumentalists, none of the songs feel overdone or over performed. The whole album has a magnificently peaceful ambiance that is layered with elegant instrumentation. There are a quite a few things that stand out about this project - the tender tone, the excellent musicianship, and the quality of the singers' voices, but the lyrics could have been stronger and the album's running time could have been cut down considerably." Matt Collar of All Music said, "Recorded live in 2014, Bethel Music's We Will Not Be Shaken showcases the praise and worship ensemble performing in a beautiful mountaintop setting in Redding, California. Showcased here are Bethel Music singer/songwriters Brian and Jenn Johnson, Matt Stinton, Amanda Cook, and Hunter Thompson. Also featured are inspirational contributions from several worship leaders including Kalley Heiligenthal, Jonathan and Melissa Helser, and others. Included are moving renditions of such songs as "Ever Be," "You Don't Miss a Thing," "Nearness," Jesus We Love You," and "In Over My Head."

Awards and accolades
This album was No. 3, on the Worship Leader'''s Top 20 Albums of 2015 list. 
The song, "Ever Be", which featured the vocals of Kalley Heiligenthal, was No. 18 on the Worship Leader'''s Top 20 Songs of 2015 list.

In August 2016, the Gospel Music Association announced the nominees of the 47th Annual GMA Dove Awards with "No Longer Slaves" being nominated for a Dove Award in the "Worship Song of the Year" category. On October 11, 2016, "No Longer Slaves" won the GMA Dove Award at a ceremony held at the Allen Arena on the campus of Lipscomb University in Nashville, Tennessee, with Jonathan David & Melissa Helser performing the song that night.

On August 9, 2017, it was announced that the song "Ever Be" would be nominated for a GMA Dove Award in the Worship Song of the Year category. However, the song did not win the award.

Track listing

Credits
Adapted from AllMusic.

 Paul Arend – background vocals
 Amanda Cook – vocals
 Chris Greely – acoustic guitar, background vocals, drums, electric guitar, mixing engineer, percussion, producer
 Kalley Heiligenthal – vocals
 Jonathan David Helser – vocals
 Melissa Helser – vocals
 Luke Hendrickson – keyboard
 Kiley Hill – production coordination
 Hannah Jeanpierre – violin
 Ted Jensen – mastering
 Brian Johnson – acoustic guitar, executive producer, vocals
 Jenn Johnson – background vocals, vocals
 Hannah McClure – background vocals, vocals
 Paul McClure – vocals
 Matthew Ogden – bass
 Michael Pope – acoustic guitar, electric guitar
 Asher Stanley – cello
 Matt Stinton – vocals
 Bobby Strand – acoustic guitar, background vocals, drums, electric guitar, keyboard, percussion, producer
 Lindsey Strand – background vocals, production assistant
 Joel Taylor – executive producer
 Hunter Thompson – acoustic guitar, vocals
 Jonah Thompson – monitors
 Stephen James Hart – visual worship leader, photography, design
 Joe Volk – background vocals, drums, percussion
 David Whitworth – drums, percussion
 Matthew Wilcox – additional production, drums, keyboard, percussion
 Allison Wyatt – violin

Charts

Weekly charts

Year-end charts

Decade-end charts

Certifications and sales

References

2015 albums
Bethel Music albums